Iduno Santoni (born November 28, 1968) is an Italian sprint canoer who competed in the early 1990s. He was eliminated in the semifinals of the K-4 1000 m event at the 1992 Summer Olympics in Barcelona.

References
Sports-Reference.com profile

1968 births
Canoeists at the 1992 Summer Olympics
Italian male canoeists
Living people
Olympic canoeists of Italy
Place of birth missing (living people)
20th-century Italian people